Among those who were born in the London Borough of Merton, or have dwelt within the borders of the modern borough are (alphabetical order):

A
Khalid Abdalla – actor, The Kite Runner and United 93
Admiral Mariot Arbuthnot – Commander of the Royal Navy in North America during the American War of Independence
Bob Astles – former associate of Ugandan presidents Milton Obote and Idi Amin
Ray Austin – TV and film director, actor, stuntman; born in Merton

B
Barloc of Norbury
Ben Barnes – actor, The Chronicles of Narnia, Prince Caspian
Cyril Barton – posthumously awarded the Victoria Cross during World War II
Ian Bazalgette – posthumously awarded the Victoria Cross during World War II
Sir Joseph Bazalgette (1819–1891) – civil engineer; his creation in the mid-19th century of the sewer network for central London eliminated cholera epidemics
Dave Benson-Phillips – children's television presenter, lived in Cannon Hill Lane
Bernard Braden – TV personality, mainly of the 1960s
Jo Brand – comedian, lived in Mitcham
Martin Brett (Brett Martini) – musician, voice of Beehive
Richard Briers – actor
Raymond Briggs – cartoonist
Steve Brookstein – winner of the first series of TV talent show The X Factor
James Brunlees – engineer, lived at Argyle Lodge, Parkside
Roy Budd – jazz musician
Josephine Butler – feminist campaigner of the Victorian era, Blue Plaque at 8 North View, Wimbledon Common

C
Jane Campbell, Baroness Campbell of Surbiton – British peer and Commissioner of the Equality and Human Rights Commission
Anthony Caro – sculptor, born here in 1924
George Edward Cates – World War I Victoria Cross recipient
Ernst Boris Chain – joint winner of the 1945 Nobel Prize in Medicine for the discovery of penicillin; Blue Plaque at 9 North View, Wimbledon Common
Mavis Cheek – novelist born and brought up in Wimbledon
Sarah Churchill, Duchess of Marlborough – close friend of Queen Anne
Danny Cipriani – rugby player
Norman Coburn – actor, played Donald Fisher in Australian soap opera Home and Away
Vernon Corea – radio broadcaster
Annette Crosbie – actress, screen wife of Victor Meldrew in the BBC TV sitcom One Foot in the Grave
Ambrose Crowley – ironmaster
Steve Curtis – eight-time World Offshore powerboat racing champion

D
Sean Davis – footballer, played for Bolton Wanderers, Fulham, Tottenham Hotspur and Portsmouth
Clint Dempsey – footballer, during his playing career at Fulham
Sandy Denny – singer, born at the Nelson Hospital
Laurence Doherty – winner of thirteen Wimbledon tennis championships and two Olympic gold medals
Reginald Doherty – winner of twelve Wimbledon tennis championships and three Olympic gold medals
John Donne – Jacobean poet
Hugh Dowding – commander of RAF Fighter Command during the Battle of Britain in 1940, Blue Plaque at 3 St Mary's Road
Henry Dundas, Viscount Melville – Home Secretary and Secretary of State for War to William Pitt the Younger, resident of Cannizaro House

F
The Field Mice – pop group
Michael Fielding – The Mighty Boosh comedian; Noel's younger brother
Noel Fielding – The Mighty Boosh comedian
Mike Fillery – footballer
Ford Madox Ford (1873–1939) – author; works include The Good Soldier and Parade's End

G
Paul Geraghty – author, illustrator
David Gibson – cricketer
John William Godward – painter
Good Shoes – indie music band whose first album, Think Before You Speak, included the track "Morden"
Charles Patrick Graves – journalist
Robert Graves – poet
Deryck Guyler – actor

H
Haile Selassie I of Ethiopia – guest at a house in Parkside while in exile from Ethiopia owing to the Italian invasion; his statue stands in Cannizaro Park
Victoria Hamilton – actress
George Hamilton-Gordon, 4th Earl of Aberdeen – prime minister 1852–55; resident of Cannizaro House
Florence Harmer – historian, born in Mitcham
Will Hay – actor
Tubby Hayes – jazz musician
Georgette Heyer – novelist, born and grew up in Wimbledon; wrote her first five novels there; a later novel, Pastel, is set in a suburb very like Wimbledon
Leslie Hore-Belisha, 1st Baron Hore-Belisha – while Minister of Transport, 1934–7, he introduced the driving test and the Belisha Beacon; then Secretary of State for War, 1937–40
John Horne Tooke – politician, lived at Chester House on Wimbledon Common
Neil Howlett – opera singer, born in Mitcham
Thomas Hughes – author of Tom Brown's Schooldays, written in Wimbledon
James Hunt – 1976 Formula 1 World Champion

J
Vinnie Jones – former footballer and film actor

K
Barbara Kelly – TV personality
Hetty King – music hall artiste and male impersonator; a blue commemorative plaque was erected on her home in Palmerston Road, Wimbledon by The Music Hall Guild of Great Britain and America in November 2010
Lorelei King – actress
Maxwell Knight – spymaster
David Kynaston – author, historian

L
Jay Laga'aia – actor
Don Lang – Britain's answer to Bill Haley; with his band, a mainstay of Britain's first television rock and roll programme Six-Five Special
Libera – boy vocalists; regular contributors to the BBC's Songs of Praise TV programme; have toured extensively throughout the world; have released several chart-topping albums; based at St Phillip's Parish Church in Norbury
Glen Little – footballer
Sir Joseph Norman Lockyer – scientist and astronomer; joint discoverer of helium

M
M.I.A. – singer-songwriter and rapper
Alexander Maconochie – founder of the Royal Geographical Society; penal reformer
Frederick Marryat – author, Blue Plaque at Gothic Lodge, 6 Woodhayes Road; also lived at Wimbledon House
John Martyn – singer-songwriter
Master Shortie – MC
Tony McGuinness – musician, Above and Beyond
Will Mellor – actor
Thomas Ralph Merton – physicist
Sally Morgan – celebrity psychic medium
Mud – glam rock group
Marcus Mumford – musician, Mumford & Sons
Gillian Murphy – dancer, American Ballet Theatre
John Murray III (1808–1892) – publisher; significant publications include Charles Darwin's The Origin of Species; built a house called "Newstead" at Somerset road.
Mat McNerney – singer-songwriter Hexvessel, Beastmilk, Grave Pleasures, Code, Dødheimsgard, guitarist, grew up in Wimbledon and attended Donhead Catholic Prep School and Wimbledon College

N
Lord Horatio Nelson – Admiral; his estate, Merton Place, included part of Wimbledon at the eastern end of the Broadway, though strictly he was a resident of Merton, the neighbouring parish

O
Mikel John Obi – Chelsea FC defensive midfielder

P
F.W.J. Palmer – engineer, born here
Alan Pardew – football manager
Michelle Paver – author, Chronicles of Ancient Darkness
Charles Pepys, 1st Earl of Cottenham – Lord Chancellor
Augustus Porter – socialite
Chris Powell – manager of The Championship football club Charlton Athletic, former footballer, grew up in Mitcham
Sir William Henry Preece – developed English telephone system; Blue Plaque at Gothic Lodge, 6 Woodhayes Road
Robert Prizeman – classical crossover music composer; choirmaster of Libera and St Phillip's Parish Church, Norbury; composed the BBC's Songs of Praise signature music
Steve Punt – comedian

R
Oliver Reed – actor
Diana Rigg – actress
Laura Robson – Junior Wimbledon tennis champion
Annie Ross – jazz singer
Rox – musician
Margaret Rutherford – actress, Blue Plaque at 4 Berkeley Place

S
Sampha – singer-songwriter, known for collaborative work with SBTRKT, Jessie Ware and Drake
Arthur Schopenhauer – philosopher, Blue Plaque at Eagle House where he lived in 1803
Ridley Scott – film director, Blade Runner and Gladiator
Jay Sean – R&B singer
Brian Sewell – art critic and media personality
Slick Rick (Richard Walters) – rapper, hip-hop musician, born in Mitcham but moved to the Bronx, New York
Shane Smeltz – New Zealand footballer: lived in Mitcham when he played for AFC Wimbledon
Mark Edgley Smith – composer
Alex Stepney – former Manchester United footballer and 1968 European Cup winner
Steve-O – Jackass performer
Herbert Strudwick – cricket wicket-keeper
Graham Stuart – footballer
Dave Swarbrick – fiddler of Fairport Convention

T
Jamie T – singer-songwriter and musician
Arnold Toynbee (1852–1883) – economic historian, Blue Plaque at 49 Wimbledon Parkside
Joseph Toynbee (1815–1866) – surgeon, Blue Plaque at 49 Wimbledon Parkside
Ralph Tubbs – architect; his buildings include the Dome of Discovery and Charing Cross Hospital
John Mosely Turner – supercentenarian

W
Terri Walker – R&B and soul singer
Max Wall – actor, comedian and entertainer
David Walliams – actor, comedian, TV sensation, children's book writer - awarded OBE from Queen
Charles Watson-Wentworth, 2nd Marquess of Rockingham (1730–1782) – twice Prime Minister
William Allison White – recipient of the Victoria Cross
William Wilberforce (1759–1833) – 19th-century anti-slavery campaigner
Nigel Winterburn – football player
Jamie Woon – singer-songwriter

Y
Young MC (Marvin Young) – hip-hop musician, born in Wimbledon and moved to Queens, New York

Z
Faryadi Sarwar Zardad – Afghan warlord; later tried for war crimes, convicted and imprisoned

References

Merton
People from the London Borough of Merton